Reclazepam is a drug which is a benzodiazepine derivative. It has sedative and anxiolytic effects similar to those produced by other benzodiazepine derivatives, and has a short duration of action.

Synthesis

The reduction of the lactam in Delorazepam with lithium aluminium hydride gives CID:20333776 (1). Condensation with 2-chloroacetylisocyanate [4461-30-7] (2) proceeds to afford urea, CID:20333773 (3). Reaction of that with sodium iodide and base probably proceeds initially by halogen exchange of iodine for chlorine (Finkelstein reaction). Subsequent replacement of iodide by the enol anion of the urea oxygen results in formation of the oxazolone ring. There is thus obtained reclazepam (4).

See also 
Benzodiazepine

References 

Benzodiazepines
Chloroarenes
GABAA receptor positive allosteric modulators
Oxazolones